Roy Alan Rosenzweig (August 6, 1950 – October 11, 2007) was an American historian. He was the founder and director of the Center for History and New Media at George Mason University from 1994 until his death in October 2007 from lung cancer, aged 57. After his death, the center was renamed the Roy Rosenzweig Center for History and New Media in his honor.

Early life and education 
Roy Alan Rosenzweig was born on August 6, 1950, in New York City and was raised in Bayside, Queens. He graduated from Columbia College with a Bachelor of Arts, magna cum laude, in 1971 and received a fellowship to study history at St John's College, Cambridge. In 1978, Rosenzweig earned his Doctor of Philosophy in history from Harvard University.

Career
Rosenzweig was the co-author, with Elizabeth Blackmar, of The Park and the People: A History of Central Park, which won several awards including the 1993 Historic Preservation Book Award and the 1993 Urban History Association Prize for Best Book on North American Urban History. He also co-authored (with David Thelen) The Presence of the Past: Popular Uses of History in American Life, which won prizes from the University of Mary Washington Center for Historic Preservation and the American Association for State and Local History. He was co-author, with Steve Brier and Joshua Brown, of the American Social History Project's CD-ROM, Who Built America? , which won James Harvey Robinson Prize of American Historical Association for its “outstanding contribution to the teaching and learning of history.”

Rosenzweig's other books include Eight Hours for What We Will: Workers and Leisure in an Industrial City, 1870–1920 and edited volumes on history museums (History Museums in the United States: A Critical Assessment), history and the public (Presenting the Past: Essays on History and the Public), history teaching (Experiments in History Teaching), oral history (Government and the Arts in 1930s America), and recent history (A Companion to Post-1945 America). His most recent book (co-authored with Daniel Cohen) is Digital History: A Guide to Gathering, Preserving, and Presenting the Past on the Web, He has been the recipient of a Guggenheim Fellowship and has lectured in Australia as a Fulbright Professor. He recently served as Vice-President for Research of the American Historical Association.

As founder and director of the Center for History and New Media (CHNM), he was involved in a number of different digital history projects including websites on U.S. history, historical thinking, the French Revolution, the history of science and technology, world history, and the September 11, 2001, attacks. All of these are available through the CHNM web site. His work in digital history was recognized in 2003 with the Richard W. Lyman Award (awarded by the National Humanities Center and the Rockefeller Foundation) for “outstanding achievement in the use of information technology to advance scholarship and teaching in the humanities.”

In June 2006 he published an article about English Wikipedia in the Journal of American History, "Can History Be Open Source? Wikipedia and the Future of the Past". The article discusses the pros and cons of using Wikipedia as a historical, reliable source and attempts to answer questions on Wikipedia's history and its impact on historical writing.

Selected bibliography
 
 
 
 
 
 
 
 
 
 Rosenzweig, Roy. (2006) “Can History Be Open Source? Wikipedia and the Future of the Past.” Journal of American History 117–146

References

External links
 Coalition for Networked Information: Spring 2006 task force meeting.
 Washington Post obituary
 thanksroy.org Memorial website
 Many of Roy Rosenzweig's essays Roy Rosenzweig Center for History and New Media
   Roy Rosenzweig at the Worcester Writers' Project
   The Roy Rosenzweig Archives Collection at George Mason University
 

1950 births
2007 deaths
20th-century American historians
American male non-fiction writers
Deaths from lung cancer
George Mason University faculty
Harvard University alumni
20th-century American male writers
Columbia College (New York) alumni
Alumni of St John's College, Cambridge